[[File:Rixens jour de vernissage.jpg|thumb|right|300px|Formally dressed patrons at the Salon in 1890. 'Un Jour de vernissage au palais des Champs-Élysées by Jean-André Rixens featuring Tigresse apportant un paon à ses petits by Auguste Cain.]]

The Salon, or rarely Paris Salon (French: Salon de Paris ), beginning in 1667 was the official art exhibition of the Académie des Beaux-Arts in Paris. Between 1748 and 1890 it was arguably the greatest annual or biennial art event in the Western world. At the 1761 Salon, thirty-three painters, nine sculptors, and eleven engravers contributed. From 1881 onward, it was managed by the Société des Artistes Français.

 Origins 
In 1667, the royally sanctioned French institution of art patronage, the Académie royale de peinture et de sculpture (a division of the Académie des beaux-arts), held its first semi-public art exhibit at the Salon Carré. The Salon's original focus was the display of the work of recent graduates of the École des Beaux-Arts, which was created by Cardinal Mazarin, chief minister of France, in 1648. Exhibition at the Salon de Paris was essential for any artist to achieve success in France for at least the next 200 years. Exhibition in the Salon marked a sign of royal favor.

In 1725, the Salon was held in the Palace of the Louvre, when it became known as Salon or Salon de Paris. In 1737, the exhibitions, held from 18 August 1737 to 5 September 1737 at the Grand Salon of the Louvre, became public. They were held, at first, annually, and then biennially, in odd-numbered years. They would start on the feast day of St. Louis (25 August) and run for some weeks. Once made regular and public, the Salon's status was "never seriously in doubt". In 1748 a jury of awarded artists was introduced. From this time forward, the influence of the Salon was undisputed.

 Prominence (1748–1890) 

The Salon exhibited paintings floor-to-ceiling and on every available inch of space. The jostling of artwork became the subject of many other paintings, including Pietro Antonio Martini's Salon of 1785. Printed catalogues of the Salons are primary documents for art historians. Critical descriptions of the exhibitions published in the gazettes mark the beginning of the modern occupation of art critic. The French salon, a product of the Enlightenment in the early 18th century, was a key institution in which women played a central role. Salons provided a place for women and men to congregate for intellectual discourse.

The French revolution opened the exhibition to foreign artists. In the 19th century the idea of a public Salon extended to an annual government-sponsored juried exhibition of new painting and sculpture, held in large commercial halls, to which the ticket-bearing public was invited. The vernissage (varnishing) of opening night was a grand social occasion, and a crush that gave subject matter to newspaper caricaturists like Honoré Daumier. Charles Baudelaire, Denis Diderot and others wrote reviews of the Salons.

After the 1848 revolution liberalized the Salon, far fewer works were refused.  Medals were introduced in 1849.

 Early splinter groups 
The increasingly conservative and academic juries were not receptive to the Impressionist painters, whose works were usually rejected, or poorly placed if accepted. The Salon opposed the Impressionists' shift away from traditional painting styles. In 1863 the Salon jury turned away an unusually high number of the submitted paintings. An uproar resulted, particularly from regular exhibitors who had been rejected. In order to prove that the Salons were democratic, Napoleon III instituted the Salon des Refusés, containing a selection of the works that the Salon had rejected that year. It opened on 17 May 1863, marking the birth of the avant-garde. The Impressionists held their own independent exhibitions in 1874, 1876, 1877, 1879, 1880, 1881, 1882 and 1886.

In 1881 the government withdrew official sponsorship from the annual Salon, and a group of artists organized the Société des Artistes Français to take responsibility for the show.

 Secessions 
In December 1890, the leader of the Société des Artistes Français, William-Adolphe Bouguereau, proposed that the Salon should be an exhibition of young, not-yet-awarded, artists. Ernest Meissonier, Puvis de Chavannes, Auguste Rodin and others rejected the proposal and broke way to create the Société Nationale des Beaux-Arts, with its own exhibition, immediately referred to in the press as the Salon du Champ de Mars  or the Salon de la Société Nationale des Beaux–Arts. Soon, it was also widely known as the Nationale.

In 1903, in response to what many artists at the time felt was a bureaucratic and conservative organization, a group of painters and sculptors, led by Pierre-Auguste Renoir and Auguste Rodin, organized the Salon d'Automne.

 See also 

 Academic art
 Académie de peinture et de sculpture 
 Académie des beaux-arts
 Salon (gathering)
 French salons and exhibitions

Other salons
 Salon des Refusés
 Salon des Indépendants
 Salon d'Automne
 Women's literary salons and societies in the Arab world

Gallery

References

Sources
 J. J. Marquet de Vasselot: Répertoire des catalogues du musée du Louvre, 1793–1917
 Thomas Crow: Painters and Public Life in 18th Century Paris. Yale University Press 1987
 Patricia Mainardi: The End of the Salon: Art and the State in the Early Third Republic, Cambridge University Press, 1993.
 Fae Brauer, Rivals and Conspirators: The Paris Salons and the Modern Art Centre, Newcastle upon Tyne, Cambridge Scholars, 2013.
 Albert Boime, "The Salon des Refuses and the Evolution of Modern Art", Art Quarterly 32 (Winter 1969): 41 1-26
 Margo Bistis, "Bad Art: The Decline of Academic Art in the Caricatural Salon", International Journal of Comic Art''  7, no.1 (Spring 2005); 126–148.

External links 

Timeline of the Paris Salons
Harriet Griffiths and Alister Mill, Database of Salon Artists, 1827-1850 (salonartists.org)
Catalogue illustré du Salon, 1879 – 1913. Gallica, Bibliothèque nationale de France

Art exhibitions in France
Arts in Paris
Painting in Paris
Annual events in Paris
1725 establishments in France